Lietinna is a rural locality in the local government area (LGA) of Dorset in the North-east LGA region of Tasmania. The 2016 census recorded a population of 58 for the state suburb of Lietinna.

History 
Lietinna was gazetted as a locality in 1964. It is believed that the name is an Aboriginal word of undetermined meaning. The former North East Railway line passed through from west to east.

Geography
The Brid River forms part of the eastern boundary.

Road infrastructure 
Route B81 (Golconda Road) passes through from west to east.

References

Towns in Tasmania
Localities of Dorset Council (Australia)